José Navarro (born June 7, 1981 in Los Angeles) is a professional boxer who competes in the Flyweight division. Navarro participated at the Summer Olympics in 2000 in Sydney, Australia. He is of Mexican descent.

Amateur career
Member of the 2000 USA Olympic Team boxing in the Flyweight class. His results were:
Defeated Hermensen Ballo (Indonesia) 16-10
Defeated Hicham Mesbahi (Morocco) 12-9
Lost to Jérôme Thomas (France) 12-23

Pro career
Navarro turned pro in 2001. In 2003, he became the WBC Continental Americas super flyweight champion and the International Boxing Association super flyweight champion when he defeated Reynaldo Hurtado. In 2005 at 21-0 he lost a close decision to Katsushige Kawashima for the WBC super flyweight title in Japan.  In 2006 he traveled to Japan again to challenge Masamori Tokuyama for the WBC super flyweight title and lost a decision.  Starting in 2012, he is now a boxing trainer working in Los Angeles.

References

External links

1981 births
Living people
Boxers from Los Angeles
Flyweight boxers
Boxers at the 1999 Pan American Games
Boxers at the 2000 Summer Olympics
Olympic boxers of the United States
American boxers of Mexican descent
American male boxers
Pan American Games medalists in boxing
Pan American Games silver medalists for the United States
Medalists at the 1999 Pan American Games